Miss Georgia may refer to these national/state pageants:
Miss Georgia (country), affiliates with Miss World and Miss Universe
Miss Georgia (U.S. state), affiliates with Miss America
Miss Georgia USA, affiliates with Miss USA